Sri Lanka is a tropical island situated close to the southern tip of India. It is situated in the middle of the Indian Ocean. This is a partial list of fish species introduced to Sri Lanka.

Class: Actinopterygii - Ray-finned fishes

Since Sri Lanka was ruled by Portuguese, Dutch, and British, they began introducing a number of exotic species including mammals, plants, birds and fish. After independence the introductions continued unabated, and the breeding of exotic aquarium fish for export became popular. The deliberate or accidental introduction of exotic fish into has led to serious ecological damage because they disrupt ecosystems, and reduce the diversity of endemic fish to the degree of causing extinction. Invasive introduced exotic fish such as the Sail-fin pleco also cause economic damage by reducing the amount of local fish caught by fishermen while themselves being of no or little economical value. Most of the invasive exotic fish were originally brought for commercial purposes, mainly as aquarium fish and for food. Invasive fish in Sri Lanka are a serious issue.

An introduced, alien, exotic, non-indigenous, or non-native species, or simply an introduction, is a species living outside its native distributional range, which has arrived there by human activity, either deliberate or accidental. Non-native species can have various effects on the local ecosystem.  Introduced species that become established and spread beyond the place of introduction are called invasive species. Some have a negative effect on a local ecosystem. Some introduced species may have no negative effect or only minor impact. Some species have been introduced intentionally to combat pests.

There are 24 introduced fish species which inhabit all freshwater, brackish water and marine waters.

Order: Cypriniformes

Family: Cyprinidae - Carps and allies

Cyprinids are stomachless fish with toothless jaws. Even so, food can be effectively chewed by the gill rakers of the specialized last gill bow.

Order: Salmoniformes - Salmons

Family: Salmonidae

All salmonids spawn in fresh water, but in many cases, the fish spend most of their lives at sea, returning to the rivers only to reproduce. This lifecycle is described as anadromous. They are slender fish, with rounded scales and forked tails.

Order: Cyprinodontiformes - Toothcarps

Family: Poeciliidae - Guppy and swordtails

They are extensively used for mosquito control, poeciliids can today be found in all tropical and subtropical areas of the world.

Order: Perciformes

Family: Cichlidae - Cichlids

Cichlids are popular freshwater fish kept in the home aquarium. Cichlids tend to be of medium size, ovate in shape, and slightly laterally compressed, and generally similar to the North American sunfishes in morphology, behavior, and ecology.

Family: Osphronemidae - Gouramis

Many gouramis have an elongated, feeler-like ray at the front of each of their pelvic fins. Many species show parental care: some are mouthbrooders.

Family: Helostomatidae - Kissing gouramis

Single species is known. The kissing gourami is a popular aquarium fish.

Order: Siluriformes - Catfishes

Family: Loricariidae - Suckermouth fishes

These fish are noted for the bony plates covering their bodies and their suckermouths. They are popular as aquarium fish.

Order: Osteoglossiformes - Bony tongues

Family: Notopteridae - Knifefishes

Known as knifefish or featherbacks, have slender, elongated, bodies, giving them a knife-like appearance. The caudal fin is small and fused with the anal fin, which runs most of the length of the body. Where present, the dorsal fin is small and narrow, giving rise to the common name of "featherback".

References
 http://biodiversityofsrilanka.blogspot.com/p/freshwater-fish-diversity-of-sri-lanka_29.html
 https://web.archive.org/web/20150209130058/http://www.fish.lk/
 http://www.environmentmin.gov.lk/web/images/pdf/freshwater%20fish.pdf
 http://www.multifishlanka.com/brackish-water-fish.html
 http://www.naqda.gov.lk/brackish_water.php
 https://www.scribd.com/doc/15883696/fisheries-and-fish-sp-in-sri-lanka
 http://www.sundaytimes.lk/030615/funday/2.html
 http://www.ceylontoday.lk/18-19330-news-detail-invasive-aliens.html

 Introduced
Fish, Introduced
Sri Lanka
Sri Lanka